Brian or Bryan Morris may refer to:
 Brian Morris (biologist) (born 1950), Australian molecular biologist and professor at the University of Sydney
 Brian Morris, Baron Morris of Castle Morris (1930–2001), British poet, critic and professor of literature
 Brian Morris (anthropologist) (born 1936), professor of anthropology at London University
 Brian Morris (judge) (born 1963), American federal judge who served on the Montana Supreme Court from 2004 to 2013
 Brian Morris (art director) (born 1939), British art director 
 Bryan Morris (born 1987), baseball pitcher